Ko Shan Road Park is a small park located in the Lo Lung Hang area of Kowloon, Hong Kong. Perched on a cut slope of Quarry Hill, the park is home to the Ko Shan Theatre.

Ko Shan Theatre
First opened on 29 March 1983, the Ko Shan Theatre was designed as a 3,000-seat semi-open-air theatre. Because of poor design, it was suffering from inclement weather and noise problems. An improvement project of the theatre was approved in 1994, and it was re-opened in October 1996 after being refurbished.
Today, it includes a theatre with 1,031 seats, a committee room and two rehearsal rooms.

See also
List of urban public parks and gardens in Hong Kong

References

Lo Lung Hang
Urban public parks and gardens in Hong Kong